Jürgen Heil (born 4 April 1997) is an Austrian profesional footballer who plays as a midfielder for TSV Hartberg.

Club career
He made his Austrian Football First League debut for TSV Hartberg on 21 July 2017 in a game against WSG Wattens.

References

External links
 

1997 births
Living people
Austrian footballers
Austria youth international footballers
TSV Hartberg players
2. Liga (Austria) players
Austrian Regionalliga players
Austrian Football Bundesliga players
Association football midfielders
People from Weiz District
Footballers from Styria